Bret Holmes Racing is an American professional stock car racing team that fields the No. 23 Chevrolet SS part-time in the ARCA Menards Series and the No. 32 Chevrolet Silverado full-time in the NASCAR Camping World Truck Series.

History

ARCA Menards Series
After GMS Racing closed down their ARCA team after the 2015 season to focus on expanding their Truck Series team in 2016, driver Bret Holmes, who was going to start the season with Empire Racing, and his father Stacy Holmes purchased the team's assets and ran part-time in the series in 2016. Their debut came in the race at the Nashville Fairgrounds Speedway. The GMS No. 23 had won the 2015 championship with Grant Enfinger driving. Enfinger had moved up to the Truck Series with GMS in 2016, driving part-time for the team in their No. 24 and No. 33 trucks. Enfinger would become a driver coach and crew chief for Holmes' ARCA team and would also drive the car in one race, which was at Pocono and he would win that race, giving the team a win in its first season. 

BHR would field the No. 23 full-time in 2017 with Holmes driving, and although he did not win any races, he finished sixth in the standings. In 2018, Holmes and his team intended on running full-time again. However, halfway through the season, the team did not run any races except for the second Pocono race due to lack of sponsorship, although Wayne Peterson Racing used the team's car number in two races to keep collecting owner points for the No. 23 in case sponsorship was found and the team could compete again. Holmes would drive Ken Schrader Racing's No. 52 car in three of the final ten races of the season. BHR returned full-time in 2019, and Holmes finished third in the standings although he did not win any races. 

In 2020, Holmes won his first race in the series at Kansas in July. He went on to win the championship despite his team having older equipment and struggling to find sponsorship, narrowly beating Michael Self, who drove a fully sponsored car for the powerhouse Venturini Motorsports team.

In 2021, the No. 23 car only ran part-time with Holmes driving it in four races and JR Motorsports Xfinity Series driver Sam Mayer (also a former GMS ARCA and Truck Series driver) driving it in five races.

NASCAR Camping World Truck Series
On July 31, 2020, Holmes told reporter Chris Knight that he was looking at debuting his team in the Truck Series for select races in 2021. On January 14, 2021, Holmes announced that he and Sam Mayer would run part-time schedules for his own team in the Truck Series, which would field the No. 32 truck. (The team chose the No. 32 as it is the No. 23 backwards, and the No. 23 was being used by GMS Racing in the Truck Series.) On March 6, 2021, it was revealed that the team had purchased the owner points of the No. 28 FDNY Racing truck, which attempted the season-opener at Daytona, in order to be more likely to qualify for races without qualifying if an entry list had over 40 trucks. Ty Dillon would drive the truck in the season-finale at Phoenix.

Truck No. 32 Results

References

External links
 
 

NASCAR teams
ARCA Menards Series teams